Cryptantha confertiflora is a species of wildflower in the borage family known by the common names basin yellow catseye and Mojave popcorn flower. This is a common desert plant native to the southwestern United States. It is an erect perennial herb approaching half a meter in height. The stems grow from a woody caudex and form a rough clump of hairy, bristly gray-green leaves in dry, rocky areas. Out of the clump grow erect stems topped with dense inflorescences of hairy mustard-yellow flowers. Each flower is tubular with sepals wrapped around the tube below a flat-faced or curled-back corolla of five lobes. The fruit is a nutlet 3 to 4 millimeters wide.

External links
Jepson Manual Treatment
USDA Plants Profile
Photo gallery

confertiflora
Plants described in 1896